Valentovce is a small village and municipality in the Medzilaborce District in the Prešov Region of far north-eastern Slovakia.

History
The village was established in 1808.

Geography
The municipality lies at an altitude of 340 metres and covers an area of 2.206 km². It has a population of about 40 people.

References

External links
http://www.statistics.sk/mosmis/eng/run.html

Villages and municipalities in Medzilaborce District